Devosia humi is a Gram-negative, aerobic, rod-shaped and non-motile bacteria from the genus of Devosia which has been isolated from soil near a pine (Pinus koraiensis) in Yongin on Korea.

References

External links
Type strain of Devosia humi at BacDive -  the Bacterial Diversity Metadatabase

Hyphomicrobiales
Bacteria described in 2016